Sam Atkin (born 14 March 1993) is a British Olympic athlete specialising in long-distance running, predominantly the 5000 metres and 10,000 m races.

He is the British record holder for the 5 km road race and the British indoor record holder for the 3000 metres.

Running career
Sam Atkin won the North of England cross-country under-17 men’s title in Blackburn. Also a keen footballer and tennis player as a teenager, in athletics he started with Grimsby Harriers and moved to Cleethorpes and eventually Lincoln Wellington, where he teamed up with coach Rob Lewis.

In 2011, aged 18, he had the chance to study in the United States and went to Lewis–Clark College in Idaho. Atkin’s progress was affected by a rare problem called Freiberg disease, where one of the metatarsals in his foot protrudes upwards, causing discomfort. He graduated from LCSC with a degree in Business Management and Sports Administration in 2016, stayed in Idaho and also coaches other athletes. While coaching and competing he also studied at Western Governors University and graduated with a MBA in 2019.

At the Sound Running Track Meet in California on 5 December 2020, Atkin ran the fourth fastest time by a British athlete over the 10,000 metres behind only Mo Farah, Jon Brown and Eamonn Martin. Despite starting that race as a pacemaker, he hit the Olympic qualifying time for the 2020 Tokyo Olympics where he represented Britain in the 10,000 metres race, but did not finish as he suffered an injury mid-race.

On 27 January 2023 at the John Thomas Terrier Classic on a Boston University track, the 29-year-old broke Mo Farah's seven-year British 3000 m indoor record (7:33.1) with a time of 7:31.97. Atkin took 15 seconds off his personal best and set the fastest 3000 m (indoors or out) by a UK athlete in history as (Farah’s) outdoor record stood at 7:32.62 at the time. On 19 March, he sliced four seconds off Marc Scott's 2020 British 5 kilometres record with 13:16 in Lille, France.

Personal bests
 800 metres – 1:53.13 (Spokane, WA 2018)
 800 metres – 1:53.79 (Nampa, ID 2018)
 1500 metres – 3:45.07 (Eugene, OR 2018)
 Mile – 3:58.60 (St. Louis, MO 2018)
 Mile – 4:05.39 (Nampa, ID 2020)
 3000 metres – 7:39.71 (Gateshead 2021)
 3000 metres – 7:31.97 (Boston, MA 2023) 
 5000 metres – 13:15.31 (Eugene, OR 2022)
 5000 metres – 13:03.64 (Boston, MA 2022)
 10,000 metres – 27:26.58 (San Juan Capistrano, CA 2020)
Road
 5 kilometres – 13:16 (Lille 2023)

References

External links
 

1993 births
Living people
British male long-distance runners
Sportspeople from Grimsby
Olympic athletes of Great Britain
Athletes (track and field) at the 2020 Summer Olympics
20th-century British people
21st-century British people
Athletes (track and field) at the 2022 Commonwealth Games